Slime Season is the seventh self-released mixtape by American rapper Young Thug, released on September 16, 2015. It features production from a range of artists, including London on da Track, Metro Boomin, Ricky Racks, Wheezy, and WondaGurl, and guest appearances from Migos, Gucci Mane, Peewee Longway, and Lil Wayne.

The mixtape was largely compiled from tracks that had leaked on the internet in the previous year. Upon release, the mixtape received positive reviews from critics, while the single "Best Friend" charted. As well as “Best Friend”, Slime Season also included the song “Power”, which has amassed over 150 million views on YouTube as of 2020. It was followed later in the year by Slime Season 2.

Background
Slime Season was compiled from archival material in an attempt to circumvent a series of 2015 data leaks which saw hundreds of unreleased Young Thug tracks uploaded to the internet. The material may date back at least one year. The mixtape received a sequel, Slime Season 2, which was released the following month. Slime Season 3 was released in 2016. The title pays homage to Ola Playa, a rapper from Young Thug's YSL Gang who released his own Slime Season mixtape in March 2014.

Critical reception

Slime Season received critical acclaim from critics, with an aggregate score of 80 out of 100 on Metacritic. Under the Gun called it "an abstract masterwork" and "2015's hip-hop answer to jamming sonic psychedelia. Spin stated that "this is simply rap’s foremost stylist mouthing off ferociously on all cylinders." HotNewHipHop called it "just the game-changer we expected it to be, showcasing an even more confident and experimental Thugger than we heard on Barter 6." Pitchfork called the mixtape "an odds-and-ends compilation with no coherent vision," but wrote that "Thug remains one of hip-hop's most exciting stylists" and pointed out the tracks "Freaky," "Draw Down," and "Wood Would" as highlights.

Track listing

References

2015 mixtape albums
Albums produced by London on da Track
Albums produced by Sonny Digital
Albums produced by Southside (record producer)
Albums produced by Metro Boomin
Albums produced by WondaGurl
Albums produced by Allen Ritter